The James A. Rawley Prize is given by the Organization of American Historians (OAH), for the best book on race relations in the United States.
The prize is given in memory of James A. Rawley, Carl Adolph Happold Professor of History Emeritus at the University of Nebraska–Lincoln.

See also

 List of history awards

External links
 http://www.law.ucla.edu/faculty/all-faculty-profiles/emeritiprofessors/Pages/kenneth-l-karst.aspx Last viewed on March 18, 2011.
  https://web.archive.org/web/20110527183624/http://www.coloradocollege.edu/dept/hy/Faculty/Monroy.html Last viewed on March 18, 2011.
 http://faculty.washington.edu/mhoney/ Last viewed on March 18, 2011.
 https://web.archive.org/web/20110304232927/http://history.duke.edu/people?Gurl=%2Faas%2Fhistory&Uil=nm71&subpage=profile Last viewed on March 18, 2011.
 http://www.boldlysustainable.com/BardaglioCV.com Last viewed on March 18, 2011.
  https://web.archive.org/web/20110708233156/http://www.darylmichaelscott.com/resume Last viewed on March 18, 2011.
 http://plaza.ufl.edu/wardb/biography.html Last viewed on March 18, 2011.
 https://web.archive.org/web/20130622135346/http://www.unh.edu/history/index.cfm?id=2B1966F3-AC44-D4E7-54A916E20D9C7ED4 Last viewed on March 18, 2011.
 https://web.archive.org/web/20110316002531/http://departments.oxy.edu/history/fett/mainpage.htm Last viewed on March 18, 2011.
 http://sydney.edu.au/arts/history/staff/profiles/swhite.shtml Last viewed on March 18, 2011.
 https://web.archive.org/web/20110426023920/http://www.brown.edu/Departments/History/people/facultypage.php?id=10100 Last viewed on March 18, 2011.
  http://www.umas.edu/afroam/faculty/documents/SmethurstCV.pdf Last viewed on March 18, 2011.
 http://www.vanderbilt.edu/historydept/kramer.html Last viewed on March 18, 2011.
 http://www.mephis.edu/history/docs/cv_odonovan.doc Last viewed on March 18, 2011.
  http://www.history.umd.edu/Bio/greene.html Last viewed on March 18, 2011.

References

American history awards
History of African-American civil rights
Political history of the United States